Sahitya Akademi Award is an annual literary honour, given since 1955, by Sahitya Akademi (India's National Academy of Letters), to writers and their works, for their outstanding contribution to the upliftment of Indian literature. Urdu is one of 24 languages in which the award is given.

Recipients

References

Sahitya Akademi Award
Urdu